Guatemalan law allows firearm possession on shall-issue basis as a constitutional right. With approximately 12 civilian firearms per 100 people, Guatemala is the 70th most armed country in the world.

Constitution 
Guatemalan constitution protects right to own guns for home-defense:

Law 
Current law regarding firearm possession was passed in 2009.

Permitted types of firearms
Law allows civilians to own following types of firearms:
 Semi automatic pistols and revolvers of any calibre;
 Shotguns with barrel of length up to 24 inches;
 Mechanical and semi-automatic rifles.

Firearm registration 
Simple possession requires registration of gun. Application for register must include:
 Certification proving ownership and legal acquisition of the firearm;
 Certification of lack of a criminal and police record in force (6 months of validity);
 Identity document;
 4x4 photography on matte paper;
 Receipt of payment of all necessary fees;
 Presentation of firearm.
Guatemalans are allowed possess any number of firearms.

Carrying firearms 
Rules regarding carrying firearms are more strict with additional permit required and minimum age being 25 years. Only about 10% of legal guns can be carried in public places.

Firearm possession 
Currently there are 547,000 registered firearms in Guatemala (or 3 per 100 people). 60,658 people have license to carry them.

See also 
 Overview of gun laws by nation

References 

Guatemala
Law of Guatemala